Carla Prata (born September 5, 1999 in London) is an Angolan-Portuguese R&B singer-songwriter.

Biography and career 
Born in London, the daughter of Angolan parents, Prata lived as a child in the British capital and then spent part of her adolescence in Benguela, Angola. In 2018, she moved to Lisbon. She started to dabble in music when she was only 13 years old, after her father gave her a microphone and a MIDI keyboard. Her career began in 2013 with the publication of several cover videos on her YouTube channel. In 2015, she recorded his first studio song, All Right, a collaboration with Edson Roberto.

Prata has been featured on German platform COLORS, where she performed Certified Freak, followed by Owner a few months later.

Discography 

 2016 - Vol. 1. (EP)
 2017 - Com Calma (EP)
 2020 - Roots prod. Sony Music (EP)

References 

1999 births
Living people
Portuguese women singer-songwriters
21st-century Portuguese women singers
Angolan emigrants to Portugal
21st-century Angolan women singers
People from Benguela